Pictures of Hollis Woods is a  film that debuted on CBS as a Hallmark Hall of Fame film on December 2, 2007. The film is directed by Tony Bill. It is based on the Newbery Honor-winning novel of the same name written by Patricia Reilly Giff. It stars child actress Jodelle Ferland as the title character along with Sissy Spacek.

Plot
After Hollis Woods (Ferland), a young girl with a talent for art, ran away from her last foster parents, she is placed in a new foster home with a retired art teacher, Josie Cahill (Spacek). Josie is very caring and a talented retired artist, and her life could be told in her wood work, but as she's an elderly woman, she's beginning to lose her memory (Alzheimer's disease). Over time, Hollis helps Josie significantly, and she begins to feel what it is like to be needed. Life with Josie reminds Hollis of life with the Regans, the family she stayed with during the summer whom she loved, and she relives her memories through the drawings she has made throughout her life.

Cast

External links
 
 

2000s American films
2000s English-language films
2007 drama films
2007 films
2007 television films
American drama television films
CBS network films
Films based on American novels
Films directed by Tony Bill
Hallmark Hall of Fame episodes
English-language drama films